Glenicia James (born 16 June 1974) is a Saint Lucian former cricketer who played as a right-handed batter. She appeared in five One Day Internationals for the West Indies in 2003, all against Sri Lanka. She played domestic cricket for Saint Lucia.

References

External links
 
 
 

1974 births
Living people
Saint Lucian women cricketers
West Indian women cricketers
West Indies women One Day International cricketers